Nitassinan is the ancestral homeland of the Innu, an indigenous people of Eastern Quebec and Labrador, Canada. Nitassinan means "our land" in the Innu language. The territory covers the eastern portion of the Labrador peninsula.

The area was known as Markland in Greenlandic Norse, and its inhabitants were known as the Skræling.

References

Innu
Geography of Newfoundland and Labrador
Geography of Quebec
Cultural regions

gv:Nitassinan
sv:Nitassinan